Michael Moroney is a New Zealand Thoroughbred racehorse trainer.  He is notable for having trained Brew to win the 2000 Melbourne Cup and many other Group One races in New Zealand and Australia.

Michael's father, Denny, was also involved in the racing industry and he continued to assist Michael.

Michael Moroney has trained since the early 1980s on his own account but also in partnership with:
 Dave O'Sullivan
 Paul O'Sullivan
 Graham Richardson
 Andrew Scott
 Paul Moroney
 Chad Ormsby
 Pam Gerard

While based at Matamata, New Zealand, he twice won the New Zealand training premiership.  He moved to Morphetville, Adelaide, Australia in 1999 and then three years later he transferred to Flemington, Victoria.

Michael's brother, Paul, who he co-trained with at one stage is a bloodstock consultant and agent.

Michael's sister, Sue Moroney was a member of the New Zealand Parliament for the New Zealand Labour Party from 2005 until 2017.

Notable horses and victories

Michael Moroney has trained or co-trained a large number of high-class horses, including:
 Ball Park, winner of the 1994 Easter Handicap
 Brew, winner of the 2000 Melbourne Cup
 Cannsea, winner of the 2000 Railway Stakes
 Clean Sweep, winner of the 2004 New Zealand 2000 Guineas
 Cut The Cake, winner of the 2003 New Zealand Derby
 Emissary, winner of the 2022 Geelong Cup and runner up in the 2022 Melbourne Cup
 Great Command, winner of the 1996 New Zealand Derby and 1997 New Zealand International Stakes
 Happyanunoit, winner of the 1998 Manawatu Sires Produce Stakes
 Imperial Angel, winner of the 1985 New Zealand 1000 Guineas
 Jokers Wild, winner of the 2006 Manawatu Sires Produce Stakes
 Lord Tridan, winner of the 1995 Telegraph Handicap
 Mission Critical, winner of the 2008 New Zealand International Stakes
 Nacho Man, winner of the 2010 Manawatu Sires Produce Stakes  
 On The Rocks, winner of the 2019 New Zealand International Stakes
 Roch 'n' Horse, winner of the 2022 Champions Sprint (VRC)
 Second Coming, winner of the 2000 Wellington Cup
 Shizu, winner of the 1999 The Thousand Guineas at Caulfield
 Sound, winner of the 2020 and 2021 Zipping Classic
 Xcellent, winner of the 2004 New Zealand Derby, New Zealand Stakes, Mudgway Stakes and Kelt Capital Stakes as well as the New Zealand Horse of the Year in both the 2004–05 and 2005–06 seasons. He also ran third in the 2005 Melbourne Cup, behind three-time winner Makybe Diva.
 Yes Indeed, winner of the 1996 Wellington Cup

See also

 Murray Baker
 Trevor McKee
 Lance O'Sullivan
 Jamie Richards
 Graeme Rogerson
 Chris Waller
 Thoroughbred racing in New Zealand

References 

Year of birth missing (living people)
Living people
New Zealand racehorse trainers
Sportspeople from Waikato